The Cambridge History of Africa is an illustrated, eight-volume history of Africa published by Cambridge University Press between 1975 and 1986. Each volume is edited by a different person; the general editors of the series are John Donnelly Fage and Roland Oliver.

Cambridge University Press published e-book editions in March 2008.

Volumes

See also
The Cambridge History of South Africa
 UNESCO's General History of Africa, published 1981-1993

References 

History of Africa
Cambridge University Press books
History books about Africa
Cambridge
1970s books
1980s books